Nicknames abound in motorsport. They are frequently applied to the sportspeople, the brands of sports car and other vehicles, the courses, and the competitions and series.

Vehicles

Cars
When given to roadgoing production cars, this list only includes cars that had nicknames given to them during their racing career

"Aero Warriors" =
1969 Ford Torino Talladega, NASCAR stocker
1969 Mercury Cyclone Spoiler, NASCAR stocker
1969 Dodge Charger Daytona, NASCAR stocker
1970 Plymouth Superbird, NASCAR stocker
"Baby"  = 1977 Porsche 935/2.0, sportscar
"Baby Bertha"  = Gerry Marshall's 1975 Vauxhall Firenza Droopsnoot
"Back in Black"  = 1991 Racing Beat Mazda RX-7 FD3S, land speed record car
"Baby Grands"  = Dodge Dart, touring car 
"Batmobile"  =
BMW 3.0 CSL, touring car
McLaren M8D, Can-Am sportscar
Panoz GTR-1, grand tourer sportscar racer
"Belgrano"  = Toleman TG181
"Big Bertha"  = Gerry Marshall's 1974 Vauxhall Ventora
"Big Sam"  = 1971 Samuri Engineering Datsun 240Z, sportscar
"Boy Racer"   =    Ford Mustang FR500
"The Brute of the Brutes"  = 1956 Ferrari 410 Sport, sportscar
"Le camion le plus vite du monde" (French: "The world's fastest truck" ) = 1925 Bentley Speed Six, sportscar 
"Camionette" (French: Breadvan) =
1961 Ferrari 250 GT Drogo, sportscar
1966 Ford GT "J-Car" prototype, sportscar
"Can-Am Killer" = 1973 Porsche 917/30, sportscar
"Clumsy Pup" = Briggs Cunningham's 1950 Cadillac Coupe de Ville, sportscar
"Cologne Capri"  = Any factory backed...
Ford Capri RS2600, touring car
Ford Capri RS3100, touring car
"Disco Volante" (Italian: Flying saucer) = 1952 Alfa Romeo 6C 34, sportscar
"Ensalada" (Spanish: Salad)  =  Ak Miller's El Caballo de Hierro, sportscar/hot rod
"The Flying Brick"  = 
1977 BMW 320 Turbo, sportscar
1984–1986 Volvo 240 Turbo, touring car
"Godzilla"  = Nissan Skyline GT-R R32, touring car
"The Great White Whale"  = 1969 Chaparral 2H, sportscar
"GT40"  = 1964 Ford GT, sportscar
"Gurke" (German: Cucumber)  = Manfred von Brauchitsch's 1932 Mercedes-Benz SSKL , Land speed record car
"Hippie Car"  = 1970 Porsche 917LH, sportscar
"Hondola"   =   Honda RA300, Formula One car
"Hog"  = 1956 Ferrari 410 Sport, sportscar
"The King of Africa"  = Toyota Celica Twin-cam Turbo (TA64), rally car 
"The King of Cars"  = Mitsubishi Lancer 1600 GSR, rally car 
"J-Car"  = 1966 Ford GT prototype, sportscar
"Mefistofele" (Italian: Monster)  = 1908 Fiat SB 4, land speed record car
"Moby Dick"  = 1978 Porsche 935/78, sportscar
"Le Monstre" (French: The Monster) = Briggs Cunningham's 1950 Cadillac "Spider", sportscar
"The Mormon Meteor"  = 1935 Duesenberg SJ Speedster, land speed record car
"Old Nail"  = 
Gerry Marshall's 1973 Vauxhall Firenza
Jack Brabham's 1966 Brabham BT19
"La Petite Pitaud" (French: The Little Elephant) = Briggs Cunningham's 1950 Cadillac Coupe de Ville, sportscar racer
"Pig"  = Toleman TG181
"Psychedelic Porsche"  = 1970 Porsche 917LH, sportscar
"Rosa Sau" (German: "Pink Pig")  = 1971 Porsche 917/20, sportscar
"Rote Sau" (German: Red Sow)  = 1971  AMG Mercedes-Benz 300 SEL 6.3, touring car racer
"SEFAC Hot Rod"  = 1961 Ferrari 250 GT SWB Competizione, grand tourer sportscar racer
"Sharknose"  = 1961/62 Ferrari 156, F1 racer
"Silberpfeile" (German: Silver Arrows)   =
1934 Mercedes-Benz W25, Grand Prix racecar
1934 Auto Union Type B, Grand Prix racecar
1936/37 Auto Union Type C, Grand Prix racecar
1938 Auto Union Type D, Grand Prix racecar
1938 Mercedes-Benz W125, Grand Prix racecar
1937/39 Mercedes-Benz W154, Grand Prix racecar
1937/39 Mercedes-Benz W163, Grand Prix racecar
1939 Mercedes-Benz W165, voiturette racecar
1952 Mercedes-Benz W194, sportscar
1954/55 Mercedes-Benz W196, Formula One racecar
1955 Mercedes-Benz 300 SLR, sportscar
1989 Sauber C9, sportscar
1990 Mercedes-Benz C11, sportscar
1991 Mercedes-Benz C291, sportscar
1997 Mercedes-Benz CLK GTR, grand tourer
1998 Mercedes-Benz CLK LM, grand tourer
1999 Mercedes-Benz CLR, grand tourer
1999 Audi R8C, sportscar
1999 Audi R8R, sportscar
2010 Mercedes MGP W01, Formula One racecar
2011 Mercedes MGP W02, Formula One racecar
2012 Mercedes F1 W03, Formula One racecar
2013 Mercedes F1 W04, Formula One racecar
2014 Mercedes F1 W05 Hybrid, Formula One racecar
2015 Mercedes F1 W06 Hybrid, Formula One racecar
2016 Mercedes F1 W07 Hybrid, Formula One racecar
2017 Mercedes-AMG F1 W08 EQ Power+, Formula One racecar
2018 Mercedes AMG F1 W09 EQ Power+, Formula One racecar
2019 Mercedes AMG F1 W10 EQ Power+, Formula One racecar
2020 Mercedes-AMG F1 W11 EQ Performance, Formula One racecar
"The Sucker Car"  = 1970 Chaparral 2J, sportscar
"Tank" =
1923 Bugatti Type 32, Grand Prix racecar
1936 Bugatti Type 57G, sportscar
1939 Bugatti Type 57C, sportscar
"Tank de Tours" = 1923 Bugatti Type 32, Grand Prix racecar
"Tide Ride"  =
1986–1989 Chevrolet Monte Carlo, NASCAR stocker
1990–1993 Chevrolet Lumina, NASCAR stocker
1994–1996 Ford Thunderbird, NASCAR stocker
1997–1999 Ford Taurus, NASCAR stocker
2000–2003 Pontiac Grand Prix, NASCAR stocker
2004–2006 Chevrolet Monte Carlo, NASCAR stocker
"Der Truffeljäger von Zuffenhausen" (German: The Trufflehunter of Zuffenhausen)  = 1970 Porsche 917LH, sportscar
"Turbo Panzer" = 1973 Porsche 917/30, sportscar
"Wing Warriors" =
1969 Dodge Charger Daytona, NASCAR stocker
1970 Plymouth Superbird, NASCAR stocker
"The Vacuum Cleaner"  = 1970 Chaparral 2J, sportscar
"Weißer Elefant" (German: White Elephant)  = Rudolf Caracciola's 1931 Mercedes-Benz SSKL, sportscar
"Wunderwagen" (German: Wondercar)  =  Zakspeed Ford Capri Turbo, sportscar
"Yellow Submarine"  = 1980 Chaparral 2K, Indycar

Motorcycles

"Boy racer"   =    AJS 7R
"Never Ready"   =    Honda NR500
"Roton"   =    Norton NRS588
"Silver Fish"   =    Norton Kneeler

Motorboats

"The Beer Wagon"  =  Miss Budweiser, unlimited hydroplane
"Bubble-Bud"  =  Miss Budweiser, unlimited hydroplane
"The Checkerboard Comet"  =  Miss Bardahl, unlimited hydroplane
"The Coniston Slipper"  =  Bluebird K4, water speed record hydroplane

Engines
"Double Knocker"  =    Norton Manx

Machine types
"Dinoboat"  = Unlimited Hydroplane
"Thunderboat"  = Unlimited Hydroplane

Teams
"The Prancing Horse", "The Red Devil" = Scuderia Ferrari
"The Big Two"  =
Scuderia Ferrari
McLaren
"Super Best Friends"  = Super Aguri F1
"PSG of Formula One", "The Silver Arrows" = Mercedes

Events

"36 Hours of Florida"  =
24 Hours of Daytona
12 Hours of Sebring
"The Car Breaker"  = Safari Rally
"The Garden Party of the Gods"  = Goodwood Festival of Speed
"The Goodwood of the North" = Oulton Park Gold Cup, 
"Gravel Grand Prix"  = 1000 Lakes Rally
"The Great Race"  = Bathurst 1000
"Jyväskylä Grand Prix"  = 1000 Lakes Rally
"Jyväskylän Suurajot" (Finnish: the "Jyväskylä Great Race")  = 1000 Lakes Rally
"The Race to the Clouds"  = Pikes Peak International Hill Climb
"Rallye des 10000 Virages" (French: "Ten Thousand Turns Rally") = Tour de Corse

Series

"The Bruce and Denny Show"  =  Canadian American Challenge Cup
"Can-Am"  =  Canadian American Challenge Cup
"Carrera Cup"  = World Championship for Makes
"Crash Masters"  =  Fastmasters
"Ducati Cup"  = Superbike World Championship(insult)
"Europa League of Motorsport" = Formula One (Insult)
"FIA Formula Conference League" = Formula 2 (Insult)
"Champions League of Motorcycle Racing" = MotoGP (Insult)
"The Greatest Free Show on Earth"  = Irish Tarmac Rally Championship

Courses

"The Action Track"  = Richmond International Raceway
"The Augusta National of race tracks"  = Martinsville Speedway, 
"The Tricky Triangle"  = Pocono International Raceway, 
"The Brickyard"  = Indianapolis Motor Speedway, 
"The Crown Jewel of Canada"  = Cayuga Speedway, 
"The Devil’s Triangle"  = Pocono International Raceway, 
"The dusty place"  = Riverside International Raceway, 
"Eifelring"  = Nürburgring GP-Strecke,  
"Ersatzring"  = Nürburgring GP-Strecke,  
"The Glen"  = Watkins Glen International, 
"The Goodwood of the North"
Aintree Motor Racing Circuit, 
Oulton Park, 
"The Grand Old Lady" = Lakewood Speedway, 
"The Great American Speedway"  = Texas Motor Speedway, 
"Green Party Ring"  = Nürburgring GP-Strecke, 
"The Green Hell"  = Nürburgring, 
"Home of British Motor Racing"  = Silverstone Circuit, 
"House of Drift"  = Toyota Speedway at Irwindale, 
"The House that Dan Gurney built"  = Riverside International Raceway, 
"The Indianapolis of the East" =
Thompson International Speedway, 
Langhorne Speedway, 
"The Indianapolis of the South" = Lakewood Speedway, 
"The Indianapolis of the West" =
Corona Road Race, 
Ontario Motor Speedway, 
"Jewel of the Desert"  = Phoenix International Speedway, 
"The Lady in Black" = Darlington Raceway, 
"The Magic Mile" = New Hampshire Motor Speedway, 
"Millen's Mountain"  = Pikes Peak International Hill Climb, 
"The Mini-Nürburgring"  = Cadwell Park, 
"The Monster Mile"  = Dover International Speedway, 
"The Mountain" = Mount Panorama Circuit, 
"Mountain High Racing"  = Westwood Motorsport Park, 
"The Paperclip" =
Martinsville Speedway, 
Queensland Raceway, 
"Puke Alley"  = Langhorne Speedway, 
"The Rock" 
Rockingham Motor Speedway, 
Rockingham Dragway, 
"The Ring"  = Nürburgring, 
"Southern Hemisphere’s Isle of Man"  = Cemetery Circuit, 
"The Thunderdome" = Calder Park Raceway, 
"The Track Too Tough To Tame" = Darlington Raceway, 
"Thunder Valley" = Bristol Motor Speedway, 
"The Track That Ate the Heroes"  = Langhorne Speedway, 
"White Lightning"  = Dover International Speedway, 
"World Center of Racing"  = Daytona International Speedway,

Sections

"The Big Left Turn"  = Langhorne Speedway, 
"Gilligan's Island"  = Temporary pitroad of Infineon Raceway
"Haug-Hook"  = Nürburgring GP-Strecke
"Mur du Québec" (French: Quebec Wall)  = Wall of Champions of Circuit Gilles Villeneuve
"Turkish Corkscrew"  = Turn 1 of Istanbul Park
"Faux Rouge"  = The uphill kink in the middle of the back straight of Istanbul Park
"Night of the Long Knives"  = "Night of Turini" stage of the Monte Carlo Rally

Others

"Hollywood of motorsport"  = Mid-south of England
"The Nick Hogan Rule"  = Formula D new drivers' licensing (insult)
"The Matt Kenseth Rule"  = The Chase for the Cup (insult)

Organizations
"International Marijuana Smuggling Association" = International Motor Sports Association (during 1980's scandals involving IMSA drivers) 
"Ferrari International Assistance" = Fédération Internationale de l'Automobile (Insult)

See also

 Lists of nicknames – nickname list articles on Wikipedia

Notes

References

Motorsport
Nicknames in motorsport